Ganjineh (also Romanized as Ganjīneh; also known as Gachīneh and Gichineh) is a village in Shirvan Rural District, in the Central District of Borujerd County, Lorestan Province, Iran. At the 2006 census, its population was 946, in 241 families.

References

Towns and villages in Borujerd County